Zaher Al-Jamudi (born 1958) is an Omani sport shooter. He competed in the 1984 Summer Olympics.

References

1958 births
Living people
Shooters at the 1984 Summer Olympics
Omani male sport shooters
Olympic shooters of Oman